Seven ships of the Royal Navy have borne the name HMS Winchester, after the English city of Winchester:

  was a 60-gun fourth rate launched in 1693. She foundered in 1695.
  was a 48-gun fourth rate launched in 1698. She was rebuilt in 1717, was hulked in 1774 and broken up by 1781.
  was a 50-gun fourth rate launched in 1744 and sold in 1769.
  was an 8-gun cutter launched in 1763. Her fate is unknown.
  was a 52-gun fourth rate launched in 1822. She became a training ship in 1861 and was renamed . She was renamed HMS Mount Edgecumbe in 1876 and was sold in 1921.
  was a W-class destroyer launched in 1918. She was converted into an escort in 1940 and was sold for breaking up in 1946.

Royal Navy ship names